Utopia is a ghost town in Greenwood County, Kansas, United States.

History
A post office was opened in Utopia in 1880, and remained in operation until it was discontinued in 1935.

References

Further reading

External links
 Greenwood County maps: Current, Historic, KDOT

Geography of Greenwood County, Kansas